Gilead Township may refer to the following places in the United States:

 Gilead Township, Michigan
 Gilead Township, Morrow County, Ohio

Township name disambiguation pages